Moksha is a Mordvinic language of the Uralic family, with around 130,000 native speakers in 2010.
Moksha is the majority language in the western part of Mordovia.
Its closest relative is the Erzya language, with which it is not mutually intelligible. Moksha is also possibly closely related to the extinct Meshcherian and Muromian languages.

History

Cherapkin's Inscription 

There is very little historical evidence of the use of Moksha from the distant past. One notable exception are inscriptions on so-called mordovka silver coins issued under Golden Horde rulers around the 14th century. The evidence of usage of the language (written with the Cyrillic script) comes from the 16th century.

Indo-Iranian Influence

Sociolinguistics

Dialects 

The Moksha language is divided into three dialects:
 Central group (M-I)
 Western group (M-II)
 South-Eastern group (M-III)

The dialects may be divided with another principle depending on their vowel system:
 ä-dialect: Proto-Moksha *ä  is retained: śeĺmä  "eye", t́äĺmä  "broom", ĺäj  "river".
 e-dialect: Proto-Moksha *ä is raised and merged with *e: śeĺme  "eye", t́eĺme  "broom", ĺej  "river".

The standard literary Moksha language is based on the central group with ä (particularly the dialect of Krasnoslobodsk).

Official status 
Moksha is one of the three official languages in Mordovia (the others being Erzya and Russian). The right to one's own language is guaranteed by the Constitution of the Mordovia Republic. The republican law of Mordovia N 19-3 issued in 1998 declares Moksha one of its state languages and regulates its usage in various spheres: in state bodies such as Mordovian Parliament, official documents and seals, education, mass-media, information about goods, geographical names, road signs. However, the actual usage of Moksha and Erzya is rather limited.

Use in literature 
Before 1917 about 100 books and pamphlets mostly of religious character were published. More than 200 manuscripts including at least 50 wordlists were not printed. In the 19th century the Russian Orthodox Missionary Society in Kazan published Moksha primers and elementary textbooks of the Russian language for the Mokshas. Among them were two fascicles with samples of Moksha folk poetry. The great native scholar Makar Evsevyev collected Moksha folk songs published in one volume in 1897. Early in the Soviet period, social and political literature predominated among published works. Printing of Moksha language books was all done in Moscow until the establishment of the Mordvinian national district in 1928. Official conferences in 1928 and 1935 decreed the northwest dialect to be the basis for the literary language.

Use in education 
The first few Moksha schools were devised in the 19th century by Russian Christian missionaries. Since 1973 Moksha language was allowed to be used as language of instruction in first 3 grades of elementary school in rural areas and as a subject on a voluntary basis.
The medium in universities of Mordovia is Russian, but the philological faculties of Mordovian State University and Mordovian State Pedagogical Institute offer a teacher course of Moksha. Mordovian State University also provides a course of Moksha for other humanitarian and some technical specialities. According to the annual statistics of the Russian Ministry of Education in 2014-2015 year there were 48 Moksha-medium schools (all in rural areas) where 644 students were taught, and 202 schools (152 in rural areas) where Moksha was studied as a subject by 15,783 students (5,412 in rural areas). Since 2010, study of Moksha in schools of Mordovia is not compulsory, but can be chosen only by parents.

Revitalisation efforts in Mordovia 
Policies regarding the revival of the Moksha and Erzya languages in Mordovia started in the late 1990s, when the Language, and Education Laws were accepted. From the early 2000s on, the policy goal has been to create a  unified Mordvin standard language despite differences between Erzya and Moksha.

However, there have been no executive programmes for the implementation of the Language Law. Only about a third of Mordvin students had access to Mordvin language learning, the rest of whom are educated through Russian. Moksha has been used as the medium of instruction in some rural schools, but the number of students attending those schools is in rapid decline. In 2004, Mordovian authorities attempted to introduce compulsory study of the Mordvin/Moksha as one of the Republic's official languages, but this attempt failed in the aftermath of the 2007 education reform in Russia.

Phonology

Vowels
There are eight vowels with limited allophony and reduction of unstressed vowels.
Moksha has lost the original Uralic system of vowel harmony but maintains consonant-vowel harmony (palatalized consonants go with front vowels, non-palatalized with non-front).

There are some restrictions for the occurrence of vowels within a word:
  is an allophone of the phoneme  after phonemically non-palatalized ("hard") consonants.
  does not occur after non-palatalized consonants, only after their palatalized ("soft") counterparts.
  and  do not fully contrast after phonemically palatalized or non-palatalized consonants.
 After palatalized consonants,  occurs at the end of words, and when followed by another palatalized consonant.
  after palatalized consonants occurs only before non-palatalized consonants, i.e. in the environment .
 The mid vowels' occurrence varies by the position within the word:
 In native words,  are rare in the second syllable, but common in borrowings from e.g. Russian.
  are never found in the third and following syllables, where only  occurs.
  at the end of words is only found in one-syllable words (e.g. ве  "night", пе  "end").

Consonants
There are 33 consonants in Moksha.

 is realized as a sibilant  before the plural suffix  in south-east dialects.

Palatalization, characteristic of Uralic languages, is contrastive only for dental consonants, which can be either "soft" or " hard". In Moksha Cyrillic alphabet the palatalization is designated like in Russian: either by a "soft sign"  after a "soft" consonant or by writing "soft" vowels  after a "soft" consonant. In scientific transliteration the acute accent or apostrophe are used.

All other consonants have palatalized allophones before the front vowels  as well. The alveolo-palatal affricate  lacks non-palatalized counterpart, while postalveolar fricatives  lack palatalized counterparts.

Devoicing
Unusually for a Uralic language, there is also a series of voiceless liquid consonants:  . These have arisen from Proto-Mordvinic consonant clusters of a sonorant followed by a voiceless stop or affricate: .

Before certain inflectional and derivational endings, devoicing continues to exist as a phonological process in Moksha. This affects all other voiced consonants as well, including the nasal consonants and semivowels. No voiceless nasals are however found in Moksha: the devoicing of nasals produces voiceless oral stops. Altogether the following devoicing processes apply:

For example, before the nominative plural :
 кал  "fish" – калхт  "fish"
 лем  "name" – лепть  "names"
 марь  "apple" – марьхть  "apples"
Devoicing is, however, morphological rather than phonological, due to the loss of earlier voiceless stops from some consonant clusters, and due to the creation of new consonant clusters of voiced liquid + voiceless stop. Compare the following oppositions:
 калне  "little fish" – калхне  (< ) "these fish"
 марьне  "my apples" – марьхне  ( < ) "these apples"
 кундайне  "I caught it" – кундайхне  ( < ) "these catchers"

Stress
Non-high vowels are inherently longer than high vowels  and tend to draw the stress. If a high vowel appears in the first syllable which follow the syllable with non-high vowels (especially  and ), then the stress moves to that second or third syllable. If all the vowels of a word are either non-high or high, then the stress falls on the first syllable.

Stressed vowels are longer than unstressed ones in the same position like in Russian. Unstressed vowels undergo some degree of vowel reduction.

Writing systems 

Moksha has been written using Cyrillic with spelling rules identical to those of Russian since the 18th century. As a consequence of that, the vowels  are not differentiated in a straightforward way. However, they can be (more or less) predicted from Moksha phonotactics. The 1993 spelling reform defines that  in the first (either stressed or unstressed) syllable must be written with the "hard" sign  (e.g. мъ́рдсемс mə́rdśəms "to return", formerly мрдсемс). The version of the Moksha Cyrillic alphabet used in 1924-1927 had several extra letters, either digraphs or single letters with diacritics. Although the use of the Latin script for Moksha was officially approved by the CIK VCKNA (General Executive Committee of the All Union New Alphabet Central Committee) on June 25, 1932, it was never implemented.

Grammar

Morphosyntax 
Like other Uralic languages, Moksha is an agglutinating language with elaborate systems of case-marking and conjugation, postpositions, no grammatical gender, and no articles.

Case 
Moksha has 13 productive cases, many of which are primarily locative cases. Locative cases in Moksha express ideas that Indo-European languages such as English normally code by prepositions (in, at, toward, on, etc.).

However, also similarly to Indo-European prepositions, many of the uses of locative cases convey ideas other than simple motion or location. These include such expressions of time (e.g. on the table/Monday, in Europe/a few hours, by the river/the end of the summer, etc. ), purpose (to China/keep things simple), or beneficiary relations. Some of the functions of Moksha cases are listed below:

 Nominative, used for subjects, predicatives and for other grammatical functions.
 Genitive, used to code possession. 
 Allative, used to express the motion onto a point.
Elative, used to code motion out of a place.
Inessive, used to code a stationary state, in a place.
Ablative, used to code motion away from a point or a point of origin.
 Illative, used to code motion into a place.
Translative, used to express a change into a state.
 Prolative, used to express the idea of "by way" or "via" an action or instrument.
 Lative, used to code motion towards a place.

There is controversy about the status of the three remaining cases in Moksha. Some researchers see the following three cases as borderline derivational affixes.

 Comparative, used to express a likeness to something.
 Caritive (or abessive), used to code the absence of something.
 Causal, used to express that an entity is the cause of something else.

Relationships between locative cases 
As in other Uralic languages, locative cases in Moksha can be classified according to three criteria: the spatial position (interior, surface, or exterior), the motion status (stationary or moving), and within the latter, the direction of the movement (approaching or departing). The table below shows these relationships schematically:

Pronouns

Common expressions

References

Bibliography

 

In Russian
Аитов Г. Новый алфавит – великая революция на Востоке. К межрайонным и краевой конференции по вопросам нового алфавита. — Саратов: Нижневолжское краевое издательство, 1932.
Ермушкин Г. И. Ареальные исследования по восточным финно-угорским языкам = Areal research in East Fenno-Ugric languages. — М., 1984.
Поляков О. Е. Учимся говорить по-мокшански. — Саранск: Мордовское книжное издательство, 1995.
Феоктистов А. П. Мордовские языки // Языки народов СССР. — Т.3: Финно-угроские и самодийские языки — М., 1966. — С. 172–220.
Феоктистов А. П. Мордовские языки // Основы финно-угорского языкознания. — М., 1975. — С. 248–345.
Феоктистов А. П. Мордовские языки // Языки мира: уральские языки. — М., 1993. — С. 174–208.

In Moksha

Footnotes

External links

Mokshen Pravda newspaper
Moksha – Finnish/English dictionary (robust finite-state, open-source)
Periodicals, texbooks and manuscripts in Moksha language in National Library of Finland

 
Finnic languages
Languages of Russia
Moksha people
Agglutinative languages
Subject–verb–object languages
Definitely endangered languages